William Tyler "Fatty" McLain (June 4, 1885 – July 4, 1938) was a college football player, lawyer, and politician. McLain was once Attorney-General of Tennessee's Fifteenth District, Shelby County.

Vanderbilt
McLain was an All-Southern college football guard for Dan McGugin's Vanderbilt Commodores. He was captain-elect for 1909. At Vanderbilt, he was a member of Kappa Alpha.

References

American football guards
American football centers
Vanderbilt Commodores football players
All-Southern college football players
20th-century American lawyers
Players of American football from Mississippi
1885 births
1938 deaths